Merlyn is an alternate spelling of Merlin, a wizard in the Arthurian legend.

Merlyn may also refer to:

 Merlyn (cricket), an automated bowling machine used by the England cricket team
 Merlyn (DC Comics), a DC Comics supervillain and arch-rival of Green Arrow
 Merlyn (Marvel Comics), a supporting character of Marvel Comics' Captain Britain
 Merlyn (racing car), racing cars built by Colchester Racing Development (CRD)
The Book of Merlyn, the posthumously published final book in T. H. White's The Once and Future King
 Merlyn Mantle (1932–2009), American writer and wife of baseball player Mickey Mantle
 Randal Schwartz (born 1961), or merlyn, American technology writer, system administrator and programming consultant
 Merlyn Orville Valan (1926-2010), American farmer and politician
 Merlyn Wood (born 1996), member of Brockhampton

See also
Merlin (disambiguation)